Deford is an unincorporated community in Tuscola County in the U.S. state of Michigan, located along Bruce/Deckerville Road west of the intersection with Kingston Road (Section 32, North East quarter), north of Kingston and south of Cass City in the southeast corner of Novesta Township. The Deford Post Office with ZIP code 48729 serves the southern portion of the township as well as the northern portion of Kingston Township and areas in the northeast corner of Wells Township.

History
When the Grand Trunk Western Railroad was built through Deford in 1883, the station was named Bruce after local land owner Elmer Bruce. The community was founded in 1884 by Arthur Newton and named for his friend, Mr. Deford. A post office was also established in 1884. A plat for Deford was filed on July 10, 1885.

Climate
Deford's climate is much like that of Flint, approximately 30 or 40 miles to the southwest. During the winter, Deford faces heavy precipitation due to its location on the snow belt that comes through Michigan. The community is also located in a tornado prone region of the thumb area. The average amount of precipitation that falls over the community is 30.6 inches.

Government
Deford has no government of its own and is governed by Novesta Township.

Education

Public education is provided by Cass City Public Schools.
The Deford Christian Academy is a private school that had a 2007-08 year enrollment of 23.

References

Unincorporated communities in Tuscola County, Michigan
Populated places established in 1884
Unincorporated communities in Michigan
1884 establishments in Michigan